Yusuf Adam Abdulla (born 17 January 1983) is a retired South African cricketer. He played first-class cricket for the Dolphins and had previously represented the KwaZulu-Natal, South Africa A and the Rest of South Africa. A Left-arm fast-medium bowler, Abdulla was named in the Emerging Players squad to take part in the 4 Nations tournament in 2007 and played in the following years competition as well. He was currently one of South Africa's leading domestic-competition bowlers.

He made his international debut against Australia in the 2nd Twenty20 International at Supersport Park on 29 March 2009, he took 1/16 from 3 overs; his first International wicket was Ricky Ponting. He was subsequently added to the Kings XI Punjab's Indian Premier League squad following an injury to Jerome Taylor.

Early life

Yusuf Abdulla belongs to a Muslim family and was raised in Lenasia, a suburb located in the South of Johannesburg, he played for his high school in Gauteng before his family shifted to Dundee in KwaZulu Natal. He was picked by Yashin Ebrahim of the KZN academy to be trained directly under him. And after giving a solid performance in the 2006–07 season in the Pro-20 in which he got 9 wickets at an average of 12.0 he was selected for the High Performance Centre in Pretoria as one of the 20 amateurs to train at the National Academy. He is of Indian origin as his mother is from the city of Surat in Gujarat, India.

Domestic career

Yusuf Abdulla made his domestic debut for KwaZulu-Natal against Border on 16 February 2006 at Durban just after his return from The National Academy in the 2007-08 Season. Abdulla impressed with his performance for the Dolphins in the Pro 20 with a tally of 10 wickets at an average of 13.

International career

Yusuf Abdulla got his international call on 29 March 2009 when he was included in the 20-20 side to play against Australia at Centurion. Other than that Yusuf Abdulla played just one more international game and took only 2 International wickets for South Africa. Abdulla was also the part of the South Africa's 2009 T20 World Cup Squad but did not get a chance.

IPL career

In the 2009 IPL Abdulla was signed up as a replacement player. Yusuf's performances in the first half of the 2009 season created quite a sensation and gave his career a temporary boost. He ended the tournament with 14 wickets at an average of 17.21. In the following season Kings II gave him a contract of $50,000.

Retirement
Abdulla retired during the 2010/11 season citing injury. Abdulla had lost his domestic contract after injury and had no swing or pace.

References

External links 
 

1983 births
Dolphins cricketers
KwaZulu-Natal cricketers
Living people
South African people of Indian descent
South African people of Gujarati descent
South African cricketers
South African Muslims
South Africa Twenty20 International cricketers
Punjab Kings cricketers